Hahndorf Hill Winery, also known as HHW, is a boutique vineyard situated adjacent to the historic, German-heritage village of Hahndorf, South Australia, in the Adelaide Hills wine region.

Owners Larry Jacobs and Marc Dobson acquired the Hahndorf Hill property in 2002  and subsequently made considerable changes to the vineyard plantings, including the promotion and development of Austrian grape varieties such as Grüner Veltliner, Blaufränkisch and Zweigelt. A fourth Austrian variety, St. Laurent, was planted at the Hahndorf Hill vineyard in 2015.

After importing three different clones of Grüner Veltliner from Austria into Australia in 2006, and a further three clones/clonal selections in 2009,  Hahndorf Hill Winery became the first producer of Grüner Veltliner in South Australia in 2010.  It is currently Australia's only producer of Blaufränkisch.  The winery has produced a Zweigelt rosé since 2012.

Other grape varieties grown at Hahndorf Hill include Trollinger, Sauvignon Blanc and Shiraz.

References

Wineries in South Australia
Adelaide Hills
Australian companies established in 2002
Food and drink companies established in 2002